Royston and Notton railway station was opened in 1841 by the North Midland Railway, near the Yorkshire summit of the line, on the south side of Navvy Lane bridge.

The original station was rebuilt, about a mile further south, in 1900 when the lines were quadrupled. Shortly after this, the Midland Railway built a branch from  Royston Junction to the north of the station as part of its plans to reach Bradford and the north, avoiding Leeds. In the end, the Lancashire and Yorkshire Railway gave it running powers and the branch only reached Dewsbury.

It was a large station with four platforms and typical Midland Railway timber buildings although only 2 platforms were used regularly for passenger services. It closed in 1968.

Nearby was the Royston engine shed built in the early 1930s, code 20C, to provide motive power for trains from the large collieries of the area. Most of its allocation was Stanier and WD 2-8-0s plus the ubiquitous Fowler 4F's, but ex LNWR 0-8-0s and LMS Garratts were not unknown.

References

Disused railway stations in Barnsley
Railway stations in Great Britain closed in 1968
Railway stations in Great Britain opened in 1841
Former Midland Railway stations
Beeching closures in England